Lampronia luzella is a moth of the family Prodoxidae. It is found in Ireland, Great Britain, the Benelux, France, central Europe, Italy, Fennoscandia, the Baltic region, Russia, Poland, the Czech Republic and Romania.

The wingspan is about 12 mm. The head is fuscous. Forewings
dark purple-fuscous ; a sometimes interrupted fascia about 1/4, a subquadrate costal spot beyond middle, and a larger triangular dorsal spot before tornus yellow ; tips of apical cilia whitish.
Hindwings dark fuscous. Adults are on wing from May to July and fly in afternoon sunshine.

The larvae probably feed on Rubus species.

References

External links

UKmoths
Lepidoptera of Belgium
Lepiforum.de

Prodoxidae
Moths of Europe
Taxa named by Jacob Hübner
Moths described in 1817